Alexandra Dane (born c. 1940 in Bethlehem, Free State, South Africa) is an English actress who appeared in many films including Carry On Doctor, Carry On Loving, other Carry On films, The Ups and Downs of a Handyman, Le Pétomane  and Terry Gilliam's Jabberwocky.

Her many television appearances include Not On Your Nellie, Alas Smith and Jones and Pulaski. In 1975, Dane took the part of Nefertiti Skupinski, described as "O'Brien's voluptuous, South African-bred daughter", in The Melting Pot. This was a sitcom written by Spike Milligan and Neil Shand, which was cancelled by the BBC after just one episode had been broadcast.

On stage, she appeared in summer seasons at British seaside resorts such as Torquay and Blackpool, in repertory theatres and with the Shakespeare Theatre Group. She is also interested in painting and sculpting and was married to the Scottish sculptor David McFall until his death.

Filmography

Film

Television

References

External links

English television actresses
English film actresses
Living people
1940s births
South African emigrants to the United Kingdom